Moses Meshullam ben Samson Egra (– September 25, 1801) was Galician rabbi.

Biography
Egra was born in Buczacz, Galicia, but was living in Brody by the age of nine. At about that age he delivered a casuistic homily in the large synagogue of Brody, and had a discussion with its rabbi, Isaac Hurwitz, whose son-in-law he became. Egra was at first rabbi of Tusmenetz, later becoming rabbi of Presburg. He wrote She'elot u-Teshubot RaMA (Czernowitz, 1862), and an unpublished work on Maimonides.

References
 

1750s births
1802 deaths
People from Buchach
Rabbis from Galicia (Eastern Europe)